Charles Eugène Espidon Goupil (14 December 1831 – 24 October 1896) was a French Mexican philanthropist and collector.

In 1889 he bought Joseph Marius Alexis Aubin's collection of 384 Mesoamerican manuscripts. On 14 May 1864, he married Augustine Élie. After Goupil's death, his wife donated the collection to the Bibliothèque Nationale in Paris.

Family
On May 14, 1864, he married Augustine Elie. His grand-nephew was the painter Jean Charlot and his nephew by marriage was the son of Léon Harmel.

External links
 

1831 births
1898 deaths
French Mesoamericanists
Mexican Mesoamericanists
Mexican people of French descent
19th-century Mesoamericanists
People from Mexico City